Deheshk or Dehishk may refer to:
 Deheshk, Razavi Khorasan
 Deheshk, South Khorasan